Brian Craig Lee (born August 2, 1950) is a Canadian entrepreneur and former politician. He is currently the Chief Executive Officer of Custom Learning Systems, a consulting firm that specializes in providing service solutions. Lee founded the company over 25 years ago.

Political career

After his early experience in business as Vice President & General Manager of a chain of retail furniture stores, Lee turned to local politics and became the youngest Alderman ever elected in Calgary at the time. He served two terms as Calgary Alderman and then stepped up to provincial politics after being elected as a Member of the Alberta Legislature, for the constituency of Calgary Buffalo.

Elected to Calgary City Council in 1977, Lee, at the time, was the youngest person to hold Aldermanic office. He served on numerous municipal committees including: Finance & Budget, Calgary Convention Centre Authority, Calgary Police Commission, Alberta Urban Municipalities Association, Calgary Housing Committee and others.

In 1982, he was elected the Conservative Member of the Provincial Legislature representing the riding of Calgary Buffalo. Again active on numerous governmental committees, Lee's focus while in Provincial politics included: civic affairs, urban transportation, senior citizens' affairs, human rights and multicultural affairs. He was defeated in the 1986 Alberta general election and returned to private life.

Business career

Lee continues to operate Custom Learning Systems, the business he founded more than 25 years ago. During that time, he authored several books.

Recently, he created a think tank named, Calgary Leadership Forum.

Community service

Brian Lee has been involved with numerous organizations and has long-time affiliations with Junior Achievement, Toastmasters and the Canadian Association of Public Speakers.

Books

References

External links
CustomLearning.com Official site

Living people
1950 births
Progressive Conservative Association of Alberta MLAs
Calgary city councillors
Canadian businesspeople
Canadian business writers